There is no embassy of the United States of America in  the Solomon Islands.

Diplomatic presence of the United States of America in Solomon Islands began on July 7, 1978 following recognition of independence of Solomon Islands by the U.S. The United States Embassy in Port Moresby, Papua New Guinea handles the US interests in Solomon Islands. In addition to Papua New Guinea, United States Ambassador to Papua New Guinea is accredited to both Vanuatu and Solomon Islands.

The United States Embassy in Papua New Guinea is located in Port Moresby.

Ambassadors

See also
Solomon Islands – United States relations
Foreign relations of Solomon Islands
Ambassadors of the United States

Notes

References
United States Department of State: Background notes on the Solomon Islands

External links
 United States Department of State: Chiefs of Mission for Solomon Islands
 United States Department of State: Solomon Islands
 United States Embassy in Port Moresby

Solomon Islands

United States